Goodenia atriplexifolia is a species of flowering plant in the family Goodeniaceae and is endemic to Queensland. It is a woody sub-shrub covered with woolly hairs, with elliptic to egg-shaped leaves with toothed or serrated edges, and leafy spikes of cream-coloured flowers.

Description

Taxonomy and naming
The specific epithet (atriplexifolia) is a reference to a similarity of the leaves to those in the genus Atriplex.

Distribution and habitat
This goodenia grows in shrubland and woodland with a Triodia understorey between Opalton and the Grey Range in central Queensland.

Conservation status
Goodenia atriplexifolia is classed as of "least concern under the Queensland Government Nature Conservation Act 1992''.

References

atriplexifolia
Flora of Queensland
Plants described in 2002